Charles Frederick Attenborough (16 April 1902 – 29 August 1961) was a British weightlifter. He competed at the 1924 Summer Olympics and the 1928 Summer Olympics.

References

External links
 

1902 births
1961 deaths
British male weightlifters
Olympic weightlifters of Great Britain
Weightlifters at the 1924 Summer Olympics
Weightlifters at the 1928 Summer Olympics
People from Shardlow
Sportspeople from Derbyshire
20th-century British people